The 1995 San Diego Chargers season was the team's 36th, its 26th in the National Football League (NFL), and its 35th in San Diego.
 
The season began with the team as reigning AFC champions and trying to improve on their 11–5 record in 1994. After starting 4–7, the Chargers won their final five games to get into the playoffs. It ended in the first round with a loss to the Indianapolis Colts. That game would mark the last time the Chargers would make the playoffs until the 2004 season - by then, only long snapper David Binn remained from the 1995 roster.

While most of the offensive starters returned from the Super Bowl run were back, the Chargers slipped down the rankings for both passing and rushing. They were hampered by an injury to Natrone Means, who finished with 730 yards despite only having 5 carries in the 2nd half of the season. Tony Martin established himself as the club's leading receiver, with 1,224 yards from 90 catches - this broke Kellen Winslow's club record for receptions in a season. The defense continued to be solid. Safeties Darren Carrington and Stanley Richard were both released after disappointing performances in the Super Bowl; Rodney Harrison began to see more action as a strong safety, and led the team with five interceptions. Leslie O'Neal, in his final year with the club, was once again the sack leader with 12.5; Junior Seau's 130 tackles were 45 more than the next best of his teammates. Andre Coleman continued to be dangerous, running one punt and two kickoffs back for touchdowns, though he also fumbled ten times. Former Aussie Rules pro Darren Bennett was voted to the Pro Bowl in his first season as a starting punter.

The Chargers suffered a tragedy during the offseason, when linebacker David Griggs was killed in a road accident.

Offseason

NFL Draft

Personnel

Staff

Roster

Regular season

Schedule

Note: Intra-division opponents are in bold text.

Game summaries

Week 1

The defending AFC Champions lost their opener to a Raiders team celebrating their return to Oakland. All 17 of the Raiders' points came following turnovers, though they had to go the length of the field for the first of these, following an Eddie Anderson interception of a Stan Humphries pass at the Oakland 1. A 14 play, 99-yard drive made it 7–0, but the Chargers were level at the break after a 39-yard strike from Humphries to Jefferson.

In the 3rd quarter, fumbles by Natrone Means and Andre Coleman set the Raiders up in good field position; they scored 10 points from the opportunities. The Chargers drove into Raider territory three times the rest of the way, but turned the ball over on downs each time.

Week 2

San Diego laboured to a win in their home opener. They enjoyed a considerable advantage in yards gained (397 to 209), but twice turned the ball over in Seattle territory. The Chargers did manage to put together two complete drives: 75 yards on 12 plays on the game's opening possession, 80 yards in 11 plays for the winner with 13:41 to play. These drives were capped by touchdown passes from Humphries to Tony Martin and Ronnie Harmon.

Natrone Means rushed for 115 yards on 26 carries. On defense, Rodney Harrison had the first two interceptions of his career.

Week 3

A trio of big plays helped the Chargers recover from a 14–0 deficit. Randall Cunningham threw for two TDs in the early stages, the second of these set up by a Means fumble. A 38-yard touchdown pass from Humphries to Jefferson began the comeback; shortly before halftime, Humphries fumbled when sacked in the Eagles red zone, but center Courtney Hall recovered and John Carney kicked a field goal to further narrow the gap. On the first play of the following drive, Calvin Williams fumbled, and Junior Seau returned the loose ball 29 yards up the sideline, before diving over a tackle for the only touchdown of his Hall of Fame career. Early in the 3rd quarter, Andre Coleman returned a punt 88 yards down the right sideline for another score; a 2nd Carney field goal then made it 27 points in a row.

Cunningham responded with his 3rd TD pass of the game, but the Chargers' defense stiffened thereafter, and didn't let the Eagles cross midfield on their final four possessions. Another pick by Rodney Harrison clinched the win. Means rushed for 122 yards on 23 carries.

Week 4

A third consecutive 100-yard rushing performance by Natrone Means saw the Chargers win their third straight game. With San Diego trailing 3–0 in the second quarter, Means carried 6 times for 30 yards on a drive he capped with a 3-yard touchdown run; in the second half, he rushed 7 times for 38 yards on a drive which finished with his 2-yard TD run, and a 14–6 lead. After John Carney added a 45-yard field goal, John Elway led the Broncos to the San Diego 31, but threw four consecutive incompletions to end the final Denver threat. Means finished with 115 yards on 27 carries, with two touchdowns.

Week 5

A big 1st quarter helped the Steelers avenge their AFC Championship Game defeat. After Pittsburgh scored 7 on their opening drive, Stan Humphries threw pick-sixes on two of the first three Charger possessions. Both of these passes were topped in the air by the intended receivers; Willie Williams and Alvoid Mays returned them for touchdowns. Matrone Means and Tony Martin scored for the Chargers as they attempted a comeback, but a dropped touchdown by Martin and further interceptions by Williams and Mays kept them at arm's length.

Week 6

The Chargers lost a Monday Night Football epic in overtime. The first quarter saw only one possession each; San Diego opened with a 19-play drive before the Chiefs' response took 14 plays; both drives ended with short field goals. A 54-yard kickoff return by Andre Coleman then set up the Chargers for a short touchdown drive capped by Means' 2-yard TD run.

After a Chiefs field goal, Coleman fumbled the ensuing kickoff, and Kansas City recovered to set up a short touchdown drive and a 13–10 lead. The Chiefs were in position to add to that advantage shortly before halftime, but on 1st and 10 from the Chargers' 18, Steve Bono was sacked by Raylee Johnson and fumbled. Shawn Lee recovered the loose ball with 43 seconds remaining in the half, and Humphries managed to drive the Chargers into range for Carney to tie the scores.

Tony Martin fumbled away the best scoring chance of the 3rd quarter at the Chiefs' 11; the next score was a Lin Elliott field goal 13 minutes from time. On the next drive, Humphries ran for two first downs, hit Shaun Jefferson for 45 yards down to the Chiefs' 4, then threw the go-ahead touchdown on the next play. After Junior Seau and Dennis Gibson stopped Marcus Allen in mid-flight for no gain on 3rd and 1, Kansas City punted. A 44-yard connection from Humphries to Ronnie Harmon took San Diego into Chiefs' territory, but Humphries fell awkwardly on his throwing arm while completing another pass, and had to leave the game.

The Chargers ran the clock down to 1:12 before extending their lead with a field goal. However, Bono led a whirlwind 8 play, 79-yard drive and found former Charger Derrick Walker to tie the game with 15 seconds remaining. The game went to overtime, where San Diego won the toss. Gale Gilbert led the team to the edge of field goal range, but was then sacked by Neil Smith, forcing a punt. The Chiefs also had to kick the ball away, but not until after Lewis Bush had dropped a potential interception at the 22-yard line. Another Smith sack forced the Chargers to go three-and-out; Tamarick Vanover fielded the ensuing punt at his own 14, cut back to the left sideline, broke Darren Bennett's tackle and completed the first overtime punt return touchdown in NFL history.

Stan Humphries went 24 of 34, for 315 yards and a touchdown, but would miss the next game with a bruised shoulder. This was the lone overtime game the Chargers played between the 1991 and 1999 seasons.

Week 7

Gale Gilbert had a difficult game in relief for Stan Humphries, getting sacked six times and turning the ball over on each of the Chargers' first four possessions. The first of these was a misplaced deep ball which Larry Brown picked off near the Dallas goal line; the defense salvaged something when Reuben Davis sacked Troy Aikman for a safety. However, a fumble on the next possession led to a Dallas touchdown. Gilbert then converted a 3rd and 26 with a 41-yard completion to Andre Coleman, and led his team down to a 2nd and goal at the Dallas 5. However, he then threw another pick to end the threat. After a third interception, Dallas drove 85 yards to Emmitt Smith's second TD of the game. A career-long 48-yard rushing touchdown by Ronnie Harmon cut the deficit to 14–9 in the 3rd quarter, but the Cowboys rebuilt their lead, while San Diego didn't get closer than the Dallas 35 the rest of the way.

Week 8

The Chargers snapped a three-game losing streak as Stan Humphries overcame a rocky start. Humphries, back from injury, threw an early interception that Seattle converted into a touchdown 6 plays later. On the next series, rookie Terrell Fletcher sparked San Diego by taking a direct snap on a fake punt for 46 yards. Humphries found Harmon for a TD shortly afterwards; on the next possession, he converted a 4th and 1 with a QB sneak, and hit Mark Seay for another score. Shortly afterwards, Darren Bennett pinned the Seahawks at their own 1 yard line, and Shaun Gayle recovered a fumbled snap in the end zone two plays later. After a Seahawks field goal, Means broke off a 36-yard run, then went the final 7 yards to the end zone on the next play - it was 25–10 at the break. Another Humphries to Harmon connection helped keep Seattle at bay in the 2nd half.

Leslie O'Neal led the defense with four sacks. San Diego had lost the turnover battle by a cumulative 11–3 over the past three games, but won it 4–1 in this game.

Week 10

Miami avenged their recent postseason defeat in a hard-fought encounter. San Diego suffered an early blow when Means was forced out of the game with a groin strain - he had only a handful of carries throughout the remainder of the season. In his absence, the Chargers could muster only 3 points in the first half; Dan Marino found Irving Fryar to put Miami ahead, and was threatening to extend the lead in the 2nd quarter when Seau came up with a goal line interception. The scoring accelerated in the 3rd quarter - after a Charger field goal, Marino threw his second touchdown, then Humphries found Martin behind the defense for a 50-yard score. A Humphries-to-Seay two-point conversion levelled the scores.

Miami restored their lead with a field goal, and then the turnover issues which had plagued San Diego's season thus far returned. A Humphries pass was thrown behind Martin, tipped and intercepted, setting up a Dolphins touchdown. Attempting a quick response, the Chargers drove inside the Miami 10, where Alfred Pupunu lost a fumble, and the Dolphins ran out the clock.

Tony Martin caught 7 passes for 121 yards. With Means out of the game, Ronnie Harmon rushed for 52 yards while catching passes for a further 54.

Week 11

While they were only outgained by three yards, the Chargers generated few threats against the division-leading Chiefs. Down 7-0 early, the Chargers put together an 80-yard touchdown drive in response. They had a stroke of luck when officials missed Duane Young fumbling two plays before Rodney Culver's game-tying score. Thereafter, Charger drive repeatedly broke down around midfield, while the Chiefs steadily built a game-winning lead.

Week 12

A spirited fightback couldn't prevent the Chargers from slipping to their sixth defeat in seven games. John Elway and rookie running back Terrell Davis were dominant as Denver scored touchdowns on their first three possessions, leading 21–0 in the 1st quarter. A 91-yard kickoff return touchdown got San Diego on the board, before the scoring calmed down in the middle quarters. Denver led 27-13 when Jason Elam missed a 46-yard field goal. That sparked a Charger recovery, as they drove 64 and 72 yards on their next two possessions, tying the game with touchdowns by Harmon and Culver. However, following an exchange of punts, Davis ran on six consecutive plays for 53 yards, and Elam kicked a game-winning field goal with two seconds left.

Davis, a native of San Diego, rushed 30 times for 176 yards, the highest totals of his young career. Denver rolled up 463 yards, the most the Charger defense gave up all year. At 4–7, San Diego were now dead last in their division, and two games back in the wildcard race.

Week 13

San Diego upset the 8-3 Raiders on Monday Night Football, aided by three Dwayne Harper interceptions. Harper, who only had one other pick all season, also made the most crucial tackle of the game. The Chargers led 9-3 early in the 4th quarter, when Harvey Williams broke through the middle for a 60-yard run. Harper chased him down at the San Diego 33-yard line, and Oakland ultimately settled for a field goal. On the next Raider possession, Chris Mims sacked Vince Evans, forcing a fumble he recovered himself; John Carney's fourth field goal from five attempts restored the six-point margin for San Diego. Harper's third interception came in the final minute, and clinched the win.

Week 14

Rookie running back Aaron Hayden rushed 32 times for 127 yards with two touchdowns, guiding the Chargers to another much-needed win. Hayden's TDs had the Chargers up 17–3 at the half, before a Vinny Testaverde touchdown pass pulled Cleveland within seven. San Diego broke the game back open in the 4th quarter, going 96 yards on 10 plays and scoring with a Humphries to Martin connection. A Terrell Fletcher touchdown run extended the lead. In total, the Chargers rushed for a season-high 186 yards, having failed to gain as many as 80 in the four games since Means was injured.

Week 15

The Chargers overcame six turnovers thanks to a purple patch around halftime. After Mark Seay had opened the scoring, Tony Martin fumbled, setting up a short Arizona touchdown drive. Two possessions later, a Humphries pass was tipped, intercepted and returned for a touchdown by defensive end Clyde Simmons. The Chargers responded quickly, Humphries passing on 12 consecutive plays and converting a 4th and 10 en route to a TD pass to Harmon. Andre Coleman put San Diego ahead to stay when he returned the opening kickoff of the second half 92 yards for another score, then Seay scored again for a 28–14 lead. The Cardinals attempted a comeback, but an onside kick recovery by Seau ensured San Diego could run out the clock.

Humphries had a busy day, going 26 of 41 for 288 yards, 3 touchdowns and 4 interceptions. Mark Seay finished with 7 catches for 114 yards and 2 touchdowns.

Week 16

Two John Carney field goals in the final two minutes gave San Diego a thrilling win in a battle of playoff hopefuls. In the first half, Tony Martin got behind the coverage for a 51-yard touchdown on 3rd and 20, but Carney missed two kicks and the Colts led 10–7 at the break. San Diego took a 21–13 lead early in the 4th quarter, with two touchdowns either side of a Colts field goal: Humphries scored the first on a QB sneak, before finding Martin on another long pass, this time of 38 yards. The Colts responded immediately, tying the game with a touchdown and two point conversion, and setting up a wild final seven minutes.

Humphries was intercepted by Quentin Coryatt on the next play, but Willie Clark picked off Jim Harbaugh just three plays later, and San Diego put together a 47-yard drive capped by Carney first field goal with 1:59 left. Back came the Colts, reaching the San Diego 33 before Harbaugh threw three incompletions and they had to settle for a game-tying field goal with 48 seconds left. A 26-yard Humphries-to-Pupunu completion then moved the ball to the Colts' 49, before a tipped ball flew straight to Coryatt, who dropped the easy interception. Humphries found Harmon for 17 yards on the next play; after a Hayden run netted 7 yards, Carney's winning kick came from 43 yards out with three seconds remaining.

Martin caught 10 passes for 168 yards and the two scores. Carney's two field goals took his tally with the Chargers to 148, breaking a tie with Rolf Benirschke for the club record. The win left San Diego needing only to beat the Giants a week later to clinch a playoff berth.

Week 17

The Chargers clinched a playoff spot by overcoming both a 14-point deficit and a barrage of snowballs in New York. Following recent snowfall the aisles at Giants Stadium had been cleared, but there was a substantial amount of snow and ice in the seating area. Fans began throwing snowballs at each other and, increasingly as the game wore on, onto the pitch.

Humphries was knocked out of the game in the 1st quarter, and the Giants appeared in control at the break, 17-3 up. However, Seau recovered a fumble on the third play of the second half; Rodney Culver then converted a 4th and 1 before Aaron Hayden scored two plays later. Following a missed field goal by the Giants, the next four drives ended in punts.

Increasing numbers of snowballs were raining down on the field during this period, with fans targeting both the officials and the Charger sideline. At the end of the 3rd quarter, an announcement over the stadium's PA warned Giants fans that the match could be awarded to San Diego if the barrage continued. One play into the 4th quarter, referee Ron Blum stopped the game and headed over to the Charger sideline to call up to the booth and have the threat repeated. While he bent to pick up the phone, a ball of hard ice was thrown in his direction; it struck San Diego's equipment manager Sid Brooks on the bridge of the nose, briefly knocking him out.

The game continued, with stadium security removing over 100 fans. Gale Gilbert converted a 4th and 6 with a 13-yard completion to Martin; on 4th and 2 from the 8, Culver then ran in the game-tying touchdown. The Giants quickly moved into position to respond, but on 2nd and goal from the 12, Seau hit Dave Brown as he threw, and the ball looped up to be intercepted by Shaun Gayle at the 1 yard line. He returned it 99 yards for a touchdown, covering the ball with both hands as he crossed the goal line to ensure that the continuing volleys of snowballs didn't knock it loose. Shortly afterwards, Leslie O'Neal forced a fumble, Lewis Bush recovered, and John Carney clinched the win with a 45-yard field goal.

Standings

Postseason

Game summaries

AFC Wildcard Playoffs: Indianapolis Colts at San Diego Chargers

Rookie fullback Zack Crockett rushed for 147 yards and 2 touchdowns as the Colts pulled off an upset win.

References

San Diego Chargers
San Diego Chargers seasons
San Diego Chargers f